Severino Sérgio Estelita Guerra (9 November 1947 – 6 March 2014) was a Brazilian economist and politician. His last political positions in public life were as the national president of the PSDB. He served as deputy senator for Pernambuco.

Guerra died on 6 March 2014 from lung cancer in Rio de Janeiro, Brazil, aged 66.

References

1947 births
2014 deaths
Deaths from lung cancer
Deaths from cancer in Rio de Janeiro (state)
Brazilian economists
Members of the Chamber of Deputies (Brazil) from Pernambuco
People from Pernambuco